Goferydd is an area in the  community of Trearddur, Ynys Môn, Wales, which is 141.4 miles (227.5 km) from Cardiff and 228.9 miles (368.4 km) from London.

"Goferydd" is a Welsh word meaning "overflowing."

References

See also
List of localities in Wales by population

Villages in Anglesey